The 1968 UK & Ireland Greyhound Racing Year was the 42nd year of greyhound racing in the United Kingdom and Ireland.

Roll of honour

Summary
A greyhound called Yellow Printer arrived on the racing scene and was regarded as the fastest greyhound for many years. The fawn dog was voted Greyhound of the year and won the Irish Greyhound Derby, in addition to setting a new world record over 525 yards of 28.30 seconds at White City Greyhounds.

Prince Philip, Duke of Edinburgh was presented with greyhound called Camira Flash, to become the sports most prominent greyhound owner. The fawn and white greyhound was given to him at a charity meeting at Harringay Stadium just over a month before the Derby started, with the condition that all prize money earned would go to the Duke Of Edinburgh Awards Scheme. The greyhound went on to win the 1968 English Greyhound Derby.

Tracks
The Greyhound Racing Association (GRA) closed the operation at Stamford Bridge on 1 August, which left a gap on the Bookamkers Afternnon Greyhound Service (BAGS), which was taken by New Cross Stadium. Stamford Bridge trainer Sid Mann switched his runners to West Ham Stadium.

Swindon Stadium changed over to National Greyhound Racing Club rules in April and Cambridge opened on the 6 October as an independent track.

News
The foot and mouth disease had continued into early 1968, which forced racing to lose more fixtures. A new publication started called the Greyhound Magazine with the intention of giving the sport complete coverage, although the Sporting Life gave results coverage, it did not give an inside view of the sport itself.

In September the GRA moved all of the greyhounds out of the Clapton Stadium kennels at Claverhambury Farm and the West Ham Stadium kennels and put them at the training establishment at Hook Estate and Kennels, in Northaw. The kennels would now house all trainers from Harringay, White City, Clapton and West Ham which brought the estate under considerable pressure. Furthermore the move indicated that the GRA directors had earmarked Clapton and West Ham as possible future sales. Trainer Paddy Keane acted quickly and moved back to Ireland to train from kennels there. In a further change George Curtis left Portsmouth for Brighton.

Eastville Stadium became one of the first circuits to abandon grass, becoming sand based, many tracks would follow suit over the next decade. John Jolliffe, Racing Manager at Wembley Greyhounds retired after a 37 year career that started as Dundee Racing Manager, then Aberdeen and Cardiff, before his Wembley appointment.

Trainer Dick Carter and his wife Patricia were killed in a car crash on Christmas Eve 1968, leaving the Reading stadium management and bookmakers organising a trust fund for their two daughters.

Ireland
The Bord na gCon invested heavily into Irish tracks, purchasing Shelbourne Park and putting £240,000 of investment into the track. It received an added bonus when it was decided that it would host the Irish Greyhound Derby every year from 1970.

Competitions
In the Western Produce Stakes trainer Jim Morgan owned and trained the first three home, Happy Harry relegated sister Hiver Whitenose and brother Harrys Oppo to the minor placings. Tric Trac returned to racing for a short time, after taking a rest from stud duties and won the Wimbledon Champion Stakes; he died shortly afterwards following a kennel accident. Yellow Printer won the Wembley Summer Cup before heading for Ireland and the Irish Greyhound Derby. After returning to England he won the Anglo Irish International.

Forward King, one of the exceptional Leo Stack litter, won the St Leger at Wembley Greyhounds and the Scottish St Leger, the only dog ever to have won both. He also won the Wembley Gold Cup and the Cock of the North. He won half of his 70 open events but might never have reached a race track at all because when he was twelve months old, he escaped from his kennels and lived wild on the Yorkshire moors for several weeks before being recaptured.

The year ended with a major challenge at Limerick when the leading Irish star Flaming King trained by Tony Quigley, met Yellow Printer now under the charge of Paddy Milligan. The race was won by Flaming King and Yellow Printer's owner Pauline Wallis reacted by buying Flaming King for £5,000 from Frank Moran and taking him back to England.

Principal UK races

Totalisator returns

The totalisator returns declared to the licensing authorities for the year 1968 are listed below.

References 

Greyhound racing in the United Kingdom
Greyhound racing in the Republic of Ireland
UK and Ireland Greyhound Racing Year
UK and Ireland Greyhound Racing Year
UK and Ireland Greyhound Racing Year
UK and Ireland Greyhound Racing Year